Kenneth Rowe (22 December 1924 – 5 July 2014) was a British philatelist who in 1995 was invited to sign the Roll of Distinguished Philatelists. He was a specialist in the history of forwarding agents, intermediaries who facilitated the routing of international mail before the development of the modern postal system.

Rowe received the Canada Centennial medal in 1967 and the Queen Elizabeth II Silver Jubilee medal in 1977.

Selected publications
 The postal history and markings of the forwarding agents. (1st edition 1966, supplement 1974, 2nd ed. 1984, 3rd ed. 1996. )
The postal history of the Canadian contingents in the Anglo-Boer War. Vincent G. Greene Philatelic Research Foundation, Canada, 1981.

References

External links 
http://pbbooks.com/webfai.htm

Signatories to the Roll of Distinguished Philatelists
1924 births
2014 deaths
British philatelists
People from Nantwich
Royal Engineers soldiers
British Army personnel of World War II
British emigrants to Canada